Molla Yusof (also Romanized as Mollā Yūsef and Mollā Yūsof; also known as Mulla Yūsuf) is a village in Mishab-e Shomali Rural District, in the Central District of Marand County, East Azerbaijan Province, Iran. At the 2006 census, its population was 511, in 164 families.

References 

Populated places in Marand County